The 1949 Buffalo Bulls football team was an American football team that represented the University of Buffalo as an independent during the 1949 college football season. In its second and final season under head coach Frank Clair, the team compiled a 6–3 record. The team played its home games at Civic Stadium in Buffalo, New York.

Schedule

References

Buffalo Bulls
Buffalo Bulls football seasons
Buffalo Bulls football